Thomas James Duarte (born March 30, 1995) is an American former professional football player who was a tight end in the National Football League (NFL). He played college football for the UCLA Bruins, and earned second-team all-conference honors in the Pac-12 as a junior in 2015. After forgoing his final year of college eligibility to enter the 2016 NFL Draft, he was selected by the Miami Dolphins in the seventh round. He spent most of his two seasons with the Dolphins on their practice squad. He played for the Arizona Hotshots of the Alliance of American Football (AAF) in 2019, but the league suspended operations midseason in its only season.

Early life
Duarte was born in Fullerton, California to Timothy and Deborah Duarte. Growing up, Duarte was always big. He played tackle football for a year against players who were three to four years older. However, he went back to playing flag football after the players his size entered high school, and he became too big to play Pop Warner football due to their weight restrictions.

Duarte returned to tackle football as a high school freshman at Mater Dei High in Santa Ana. As a senior, he had 58 receptions with 1,025 receiving yards and 15 touchdowns and averaged 18 yards a catch. He also played on defense at linebacker, and had 42 tackles, 10 quarterback sacks, three interceptions and a fumble recovery. He was named Player of the Year by the Los Angeles Times and Offensive Player of the Year by The Orange County Register.

The son of a Mexican-American father and Japanese-American mother, Duarte was one of the rare high-profile college recruits to be of Asian descent. He was rated a four-star prospect and capable of playing tight end, H-back, or wide receiver in college. He decided to attend the University of California, Los Angeles (UCLA), his mother's alma mater.

College career
Duarte struggled with hamstring injuries during his first two seasons with the Bruins. In his junior year in 2015, he was a second-team All-Pac-12 selection at tight end. He finished the season with 53 receptions for 872 yards, and led the team with 10 touchdown catches.  His 16.6 yards per reception was the highest among UCLA receivers with 10 or more catches. After the season, he opted to forgo his final year of college eligibility and enter the 2016 NFL Draft.

Professional career
Duarte was the top performer in his position on the 40-yard dash, vertical jump, broad jump, 3 cone drill and the 20-yard shuttle in 2016 NFL Combine.

Miami Dolphins
Duarte was drafted by the Miami Dolphins in the seventh round, 231st overall, in the 2016 NFL Draft. On September 3, 2016, he was released by the Dolphins as part of final roster cuts. He was later signed to their practice squad. He was promoted to the active roster on November 5. The next day, he was in for two snaps in a 27–23 win over the New York Jets in his only action for the season.

On September 2, 2017, Duarte was waived by the Dolphins and was signed to the practice squad the next day. He was promoted to the active roster on December 20 to replace tight end Julius Thomas, who was placed on injured reserve.

During the 2018 offseason, Duarte missed part of the team's training program with a shoulder injury. He returned for training camp but was among the Dolphins final cuts before the 2018 season after he failed to supplant veterans MarQueis Gray and A. J. Derby.

Los Angeles Chargers
On September 3, 2018, Duarte was signed to the Los Angeles Chargers' practice squad. He was released on September 25, 2018.

Arizona Hotshots
In 2019, Duarte joined the Arizona Hotshots of the Alliance of American Football. He caught eight passes for 111 yards and two touchdowns before the league suspended operations mid-season.

Carolina Panthers
Duarte signed with the Carolina Panthers on April 8, 2019. He was waived on May 13, 2019.

Atlanta Falcons
On August 24, 2019, Duarte was signed by the Atlanta Falcons. He was waived on August 31, 2019.

References

External links

UCLA bio

1995 births
Living people
American football tight ends
American sportspeople of Mexican descent
American sportspeople of Japanese descent
Arizona Hotshots players
Atlanta Falcons players
Carolina Panthers players
Los Angeles Chargers players
Miami Dolphins players
Players of American football from California
Sportspeople from Fullerton, California
UCLA Bruins football players